Shari'ati Metro Station is a station on Shiraz Metro Line 1. The station opened on 11 October 2014. It is located on Ma'aliabad Boulevard a between Ehsan Metro Station and Mirza-ye Shirazi Metro Station.

Shiraz Metro stations
Railway stations opened in 2014